Alexander John Waits (born June 21, 1968) is a former American football punter who played for the Seattle Seahawks of the National Football League (NFL). He played college football at University of Texas.

References 

Living people
1968 births
American football punters
Texas Longhorns football players
Seattle Seahawks players